The Douglas County Historical Society, or DCHS, is located at 5730 North 30th Street in the General Crook House at Fort Omaha in north Omaha, Nebraska. The mission of the DCHS is to collect, preserve and present to the public the history of Douglas County, Nebraska.

General Crook House Museum
The DCHS operates the General Crook House Museum and the Crook House Victorian Heirloom Garden.

See also
 History of Omaha
 History of Nebraska

References

External links
Douglas County Historical Society - official site

History of Omaha, Nebraska
Organizations based in Omaha, Nebraska
Historical societies in Nebraska